Major-General Charles Alexander Phipps Murison CB CBE MC (7 October 1894 − 31 October 1981) was a Canadian-born British Army officer who served in both World War I and World War II.

Military career
Born in Grenfell, Saskatchewan, Canada in October 1894, where he was raised and received his initial education at Trinity College School and McGill university. Murison was commissioned into the Royal Field Artillery of the British Army in 1914, shortly after the outbreak of the First World War. His service during the war was spent overseas in Belgium and France where, in addition to being wounded, he was mentioned in dispatches and awarded the Military Cross (MC).

In common with a number of men of his generation who came to enjoy soldiering, he decided to remain in the army during the difficult interwar period and was married in 1920. Spending the majority of the first few years of his military career between the wars in India, he went to England to attend the British Army Staff College from 1928 to 1929. Ten years on from that, he was promoted to lieutenant colonel, after having served as an instructor at the Royal Military College of Canada from 1933 to 1934.

1940, the year after the Second World War began, saw Murison promoted again, this time to brigadier. He saw service with the British Expeditionary Force (BEF) in France, where he was an Assistant Quartermaster-General (QMG). After being evacuated from Dunkirk, he became Director-General of Army Equipment at the War Office in June 1942, Deputy Quartermaster-General (Army Equipment) at the War Office in February 1943 and Chief Administration Officer at Northern Command in 1945.

On account of his contribution at Dunkirk, he was appointed a Commander of the Order of the British Empire on 16 July 1940 and on account of his considerable contribution to equipping the British Army during the Second World War he was appointed a Companion of the Order of the Bath in the 1944 Birthday Honours.

References

Bibliography

British Army personnel of World War I
British Army generals of World War II
Recipients of the Military Cross
Companions of the Order of the Bath
Commanders of the Order of the British Empire
War Office personnel in World War II
Royal Field Artillery officers
Graduates of the Staff College, Camberley
Canadian military personnel from Saskatchewan
Academic staff of the Royal Military College of Canada
McGill University alumni
Trinity College (Canada) alumni